Tom Liebscher (born 3 August 1993) is a German Olympic canoeist. He represented his country at the 2016 Summer Olympics and won a gold medal in K-4 1000 m event.

References

External links

1993 births
Living people
German male canoeists
Olympic canoeists of Germany
Canoeists at the 2010 Summer Youth Olympics
Canoeists at the 2016 Summer Olympics
Canoeists at the 2020 Summer Olympics
Medalists at the 2016 Summer Olympics
Medalists at the 2020 Summer Olympics
Olympic gold medalists for Germany
Olympic medalists in canoeing
ICF Canoe Sprint World Championships medalists in kayak
Sportspeople from Dresden
Canoeists at the 2019 European Games
European Games medalists in canoeing
European Games silver medalists for Germany